John Mason James (17 January 1911 – 18 October 1999) was a Liberal party member of the House of Commons of Canada. Born in Bowmanville, Ontario, he was a publisher of the Canadian Statesman newspaper by career. Before entering politics, he was a Captain of Military Intelligence during WW2 between the years of 1940–1945.

John M. James Public School in Bowmanville, Ontario was named in his honour.

He was first elected at the Durham riding in the 1949 general election and re-elected there in the 1953 election. James was defeated in the 1957 election by Percy Vivian of the Progressive Conservative party.

References

External links
 
 Profile of John James

1911 births
1999 deaths
Members of the House of Commons of Canada from Ontario
Liberal Party of Canada MPs
People from Clarington